The 9th Grey Cup was played on December 3, 1921, before 9,558 fans at Varsity Stadium at Toronto. Edmonton was the first western team to challenge for the Grey Cup.

The Toronto Argonauts shut out the Edmonton Eskimos 23–0.

External links
 
 

09
Grey Cup, 9th
Grey Cup
1921 in Ontario
December 1921 sports events
1920s in Toronto
Toronto Argonauts